The following is a list of foreign ships wrecked or lost during the Spanish Civil War (1936–1939). Only one of these vessels lost belonged to a foreign navy – Chasseur 91, a French antisubmarine patrol boat – the remainder being civilian ships from different countries, most of them merchantmen involved in maritime trade with the Spanish Republic.

List of ships
Foreign ships sunk, wrecked or lost while involved in shipping along Spain from July 1936 to April 1939.

British flag

French flag

Soviet flag

Greek flag

Panamanian flag

Danish flag

Norwegian flag

Dutch flag

Estonian flag

German flag

Belgian flag

Italian flag

Latvian flag

Footnotes

References

Blockades
International maritime incidents
Lists of ships by conflict
Lists of shipwrecks
Maritime incidents in 1936
Maritime incidents in 1937
Maritime incidents in 1938
Maritime incidents in 1939
Maritime incidents in Spain
Foreign
Shipwrecks in the Atlantic Ocean
Shipwrecks in the Mediterranean Sea
Foreign
Ships, Foreign